Bussac-Forêt is a commune in the Charente-Maritime department in the Nouvelle-Aquitaine region in southwestern France.

Population

Notable people
 Bruce Bochy, MLB Baseball manager born in Bussac-Forêt in 1955. Manager of the France national baseball team at the 2021 World Baseball Classic.

See also
 Communes of the Charente-Maritime department

References

External links
 

Communes of Charente-Maritime
Charente-Maritime communes articles needing translation from French Wikipedia